Gloucester County Courthouse is the historic courthouse for Gloucester County, New Jersey. It is located in Woodbury, which is the county seat of Gloucester County.

It was designed by architectural firm Hazelhurst and Huckel (whose work includes the Union Methodist Episcopal Church in Philadelphia, Pennsylvania) and built in 1885. Construction included the cornerstone of the 1787 building it replaced; the bell in the clock tower is also from the earlier building.

The courthouse is a contributing property to Broad Street Historic District, listed on the New Jersey Register of Historic Places (#1429) in 1988.

See also
County courthouses in New Jersey
Richard J. Hughes Justice Complex
Federal courthouses in New Jersey

References 

Woodbury, New Jersey
County courthouses in New Jersey
Clock towers in New Jersey
Buildings and structures in Gloucester County, New Jersey
Government buildings completed in 1885
1885 establishments in New Jersey
New Jersey Register of Historic Places
Historic district contributing properties in New Jersey
Renaissance Revival architecture in New Jersey